Visas and Virtue is a 1997 narrative short film directed by Chris Tashima and starring Chris Tashima, Susan Fukuda, Diana Georger and Lawrence Craig. It was inspired by the true story of Holocaust rescuer Chiune "Sempo" Sugihara, who is known as "The Japanese Schindler". Sugihara issued over 2,000 transit visas to Polish and Lithuanian Jews from his consulate in Kaunas, Lithuania, in August 1940, in defiance of his own government (Japan), thereby allowing an estimated 6,000 individuals to escape the impending Holocaust.

Background
This film is a dramatization (docu-drama) and contains fictional characters and events. It is not a documentary.  It is based on an original one-act play by Tim Toyama, which was performed at The Road Theatre Company in Los Angeles in 1995.  The play was then adapted by actor/director Chris Tashima in 1996, and completed as a 26-minute film in 1997. The film was produced by Cedar Grove Productions with Visual Communications serving as non-profit sponsor.

Visas and Virtue won the Oscar for Best Live Action Short Film in March, 1998 (70th Academy Awards). The Oscar statuettes went to actor and director Tashima and producer Chris Donahue.

Synopsis
Haunted by the sight of hundreds of Jewish refugees outside the consulate gates, a Japanese diplomat and his wife, stationed in Kaunas, Lithuania, at the beginning of World War II, must decide how much they are willing to risk. Inspired by a true story, Visas and Virtue explores the moral and professional dilemmas that Consul General Chiune "Sempo" Sugihara faces in making a life or death decision: defy his own government's direct orders and risk his career, by issuing life-saving transit visas, or obey orders and turn his back on humanity.

Cast
 Chris Tashima as Chiune "Sempo" Sugihara
 Susan Fukuda as Yukiko Sugihara
 Diana Georger as Helena Rosen
 Lawrence Craig as Nathan Rosen
 Shizuko Hoshi as Narrator
(In order of appearance)
Japan, 1985
 Mitsushi Yamaguchi as Elderly Sempo
 Kyoko Motoyama as Elderly Yuki
Lithuania, 1940
 Colm Wood as Student #1
 Eric Gugisch as German Officer
 Alan H. Friedenthal as Refugee #1
 Patricia Penn as Refugee #2
 Richard Nakaoka, Weston Yanagihara as Sugihara Children
 Linda Igarashi as Setsuko
 Jimmy Paola as Student #2
 Kimberly Mungovan as Sugihara BabyRefugees at Interviews Martin Fontana as Man
 Noel Miller as Young Man
 David Russ as Elderly Man
 Maria Stanton as Wife
 Jude Gerard Prest as Husband
 Shauna Bloom as Woman
 Gibson Frazier as Cantor
 Jon Cellini, Jonathan Klein as Brothers
 Pamela Tretter as Mother
 Jack Newalu as Man at Train StationSpecial Appearance''
 Hanni Vogelweid as Elderly Woman at Interview

Awards
(partial list)
Academy Award for Live Action Short Film – 70th Academy Awards
1st Place: Fiction Prize – USA Film Festival/Dallas
"Francisco Garcia de Paso" Award – Huesca International Short Film Contest
Crystal Heart Award – Heartland Film Festival
CINE Golden Eagle
Special Jury Prize – Competition for Films and Videos on Japan
"Adriano Morais" Award – Algarve International Film Festival
Golden Shoestring Award – Rochester International Film Festival
Best Short Film – Sonoma Valley Film Festival

References

External links
 Visas and Virtue now available on Vimeo
 

1997 films
1990s biographical films
1997 short films
Films about Japanese Americans
American biographical films
American films based on plays
Films set in the 1940s
Holocaust films
Jewish Japanese history
Jewish Lithuanian history
Live Action Short Film Academy Award winners
American World War II films
Sugihara's Jews
1990s English-language films
1990s American films
Films about diplomats